Brookfield Residential Properties Inc. is a Canadian real estate developer that has its headquarters in Calgary, Alberta. Total assets were $4.5 billion as of June 2018.

History

Brookfield Residential was founded in 1956.

Brookfield Residential Properties Inc. was formed on March 31, 2011, upon the completion of a merger that combined Brookfield Homes|Brookfield Homes Corporation with the residential group of Brookfield Office Properties consisting of Carma Developers and Brookfield Homes|Brookfield Homes (Ontario) Limited.

In March 2015, Brookfield Residential Properties announced the acquisition of Grand Haven Homes, an Austin, Texas homebuilder. 

Contributions from Brookfield Residential Properties, other home builders, and the Government of Alberta lead to new affordable housing for homeless Calgarians in 2015. 

On March 13, 2015, Brookfield Asset Management and Brookfield Residential Properties Inc. announced the closing of the going private transaction of Brookfield Residential as a result of the 32.4 million common shares of Brookfield Residential acquired by Brookfield Asset Management.

In October 2015, Brookfield Residential purchased luxury builder Albi Homes. 

In 2017, Brookfield Residential Properties constructed a Passive house as a pilot project to educate its trade suppliers on construction methods to meet Passive House Institute standards. 

In February 2018, it acquired some of the assets of San Diego-based real estate company OliverMcMillan, a developer of large-scale mixed use properties.

Brookfield Residential Properties was awarded the 2018 Lowest HERS Index Score Canadian Production Builder with a HERS Index Score of 38 as part of the 2018 RESNET Cross Border Home Builder Challenge, which helps promote the utilization of the HERS Index.

On September 14, 2018, Calgary’s Seton YMCA was renamed Brookfield Residential YMCA at Seton after a 3.5M investment

References

Real estate companies of Canada
Companies formerly listed on the Toronto Stock Exchange
Companies formerly listed on the New York Stock Exchange
Brookfield Asset Management